List of Olympic medalists in hockey may refer to:

 List of Olympic medalists in field hockey
 List of Olympic medalists in ice hockey